Sir Christopher Conyers, 2nd Baronet (1621–1693), was one of the Conyers baronets and Lord Lieutenant of Durham. He married, firstly Elizabeth Langhorne and secondly,  Julia Lumley, the daughter of Richard Lumley, 1st Viscount Lumley.

His great-granddaughter, Teresa Conyers, became the Countess of Traquair;  his son, Sir John Conyers, 3rd Baronet was the father of  Sir Baldwin Conyers, 4th Baronet whose daughter, Teresa, married Charles Stewart, 5th Earl of Traquair.

References

1621 births
1693 deaths
Baronets in the Baronetage of England